Guggenheim Partners is a global investment and advisory financial services firm that engages in investment banking, asset management, capital markets services, and insurance services.

Organization 
The firm is headquartered in New York City and Chicago. It has more than $325 billion of assets under management.  The firm's CEO is Mark Walter. 

Guggenheim Partners provides services across asset management, investment banking, and broker dealer services including capital markets. Guggenheim Investment Advisors oversees about $50 billion in assets.

In October 2009, Guggenheim hired former J.P. Morgan head of Media Investment Banking Mark Van Lith as Senior Managing Director and Head of Investment Banking and former Apollo Global Management director and vice chairman Henry Silverman as vice chairman of asset management.

In January 2013, Guggenheim named former Yahoo! interim CEO Ross Levinsohn as CEO of private equity unit Guggenheim Digital Media.

In May & June 2013, the firm also hired Goldman Sachs Group Inc.’s co-head of U.S. leveraged finance capital markets Tom Stein, former Barclays head of retail investment banking and vice chairman Andrew Taussig, as well as managing directors Spencer Hart, Matthew Pilla, Ken Harada and Ryan Mash.

In September 2013, Guggenheim Securities was named a financial adviser to Verizon in connection with its $130 billion acquisition of Vodafone's 45% stake in Verizon Wireless.

In March 2014, Guggenheim Securities hired Eric Mandl as a Senior Managing Director focusing on Technology, Media and Telecom Investment Banking.

Guggenheim Partners Investment Management, the investment arm of Guggenheim Partners, was charged by the Securities and Exchange Commission (SEC) with failure to disclose a $50 million loan made in 2010 to a senior executive from a client. The firm paid $20 million in 2015 to settle the charges. The government agency also found that Guggenheim's compliance program did not prevent violations of federal securities laws. According to the SEC, the firm's employees did not report dozens of trips on clients' private airplanes and had overbilled a client $6.5 million in fees, taking nearly two years to reimburse them.

On December 17, 2015, it was reported that the company would spin out its media properties into a new holding company, Eldridge Industries, owned by an investment group led by Guggenheim president Todd Boehly, consisting of Mediabistro, Billboard and The Hollywood Reporter, and Dick Clark Productions.

In April 2018, Invesco Ltd. announced that it completed its previously announced acquisition of Guggenheim Investments’ exchange-traded funds (ETF) business, which consisted of $38.8 billion of assets under management (as of Feb. 28, 2018) for $1.2 billion in cash.

In October 2018, Guggenheim Securities was named the lead financial adviser to Red Hat in connection with its $34 billion sale to IBM.  The Red Hat sale was, at the time, the largest software transaction in history.

In September 2019, Donini was named to the additional role of Chief Operating Officer of Guggenheim Partners and Andrew Rosenfield, a managing partner, was appointed president. Also in September 2019, Guggenheim hired former Deputy United States Attorney and Director of the Division of Enforcement of the Securities and Exchange Commission Robert S. Khuzami as a Managing Partner and Chief Legal Officer. In the private sector Khuzami was a partner at Kirkland & Ellis LLP and worked at Deutsche Bank AG, including as General Counsel for the Americas.

Investments 
In May 2009, Guggenheim Partners acquired a controlling interest in financial services firm Transparent Value LLC.  In July 2009, it acquired Claymore Group, a firm known for its Exchange-traded funds and unit investment trusts. In December 2009, Guggenheim acquired a division of Wellmark and renamed it Guggenheim Life & Annuity. In February 2010, Guggenheim Partners acquired Security Benefit Corp, parent company of Rydex Funds. In October 2011, it acquired the life insurance company EquiTrust from FBL Financial Group. In 2012, Guggenheim affiliates acquired the US annuities business of Canadian insurers Industrial Alliance and Sun Life Financial.

In July 2014, Guggenheim announced the launch of a representative office in Tokyo and the hiring of Atsuhito Sakai as Senior Managing Director and Guggenheim’s Representative in Japan. Also in 2014, the firm acquired the London operations of Lazard Capital Markets. Guggenheim Securities expanded its investment banking business in July 2019 in Chicago with the hiring of two senior bankers from William Blair’s technology group, James Suprenant and Scott Stevens.

That September, Guggenheim bought a stake in the entertainment production company Dick Clark Productions, which produces specials such as the American Music Awards and the Golden Globe Awards and other television programming.

In January 2013, the company bought out the remainder of the business-to-business media company Prometheus Global Media and acquired CardCash in November of the same year. In February 2014, Guggenheim Partners acquired the Los Angeles Sparks of the WNBA.

In November 2021, it was reported that Guggenheim Investments, alongside the actor Channing Tatum and fellow investment company Endeavor, had agreed to backstop the planned $1 billion merger between Los Angeles-based blank-check firm Bright Lights and Manscaped.

See also
Everything bubble
 List of investment banks
 Boutique investment bank

References

External links 

Investment banks in the United States
Investment management companies of the United States
Exchange-traded funds
Guggenheim family
Investment companies based in New York City
Companies based in Chicago
Financial services companies established in 1999
American companies established in 1999
1999 establishments in Illinois
1999 establishments in New York (state)
Los Angeles Sparks owners